Methylone (also known as "3,4-methylenedioxy-N-methylcathinone", "MDMC", "βk-MDMA" and by the slang term "M1") is an empathogen and stimulant psychoactive drug. It is a member of the substituted amphetamine, substituted cathinone and substituted methylenedioxyphenethylamine classes.

Methylone is the substituted cathinone analog of MDMA and the 3,4-methylenedioxy analog of methcathinone. The only structural difference of methylone with respect to MDMA is the substitution of 2 hydrogen atoms by 1 oxygen atom in the β position of the phenethylamine core, forming a ketone group.

Methylone was first synthesized by the chemists Peyton Jacob III and Alexander Shulgin in 1996 for potential use as an antidepressant. Methylone has been sold for recreational use, taking advantage of the absence of legal prohibition of this compound in many countries .

Effects

Resemblance to MDMA 

Methylone substitutes for MDMA in rats trained to discriminate MDMA from saline. Methylone does not substitute for amphetamine or for the hallucinogenic DOM in animals trained to discriminate between these drugs and saline. Further, also in common with MDMA, methylone acts on monoaminergic systems. In vitro, methylone has one third the potency of MDMA at inhibiting platelet serotonin accumulation and about the same in its inhibiting effects on the dopamine and noradrenaline transporters.

In spite of these behavioral and pharmacological similarities between methylone and MDMA, the observed subjective effects of both drugs are not completely identical. Alexander Shulgin wrote of the former:

Pharmacology

Pharmacodynamics 

Methylone acts as a mixed reuptake inhibitor/releasing agent of serotonin, norepinephrine, and dopamine. In comparison to MDMA, it has approximately 3x lower affinity for the serotonin transporter, while its affinity for the norepinephrine and dopamine transporters is similar. Notably, methylone's affinity for the vesicular monoamine transporter 2 (VMAT2) is about 13x lower than that of MDMA. The results of these differences in pharmacology relative to MDMA are that methylone is less potent in terms of dose, has more balanced catecholaminergic effects relative to serotonergic, and behaves more like a reuptake inhibitor like methylphenidate than a releaser like amphetamine; however, methylone has relatively robust releasing capabilities, perhaps due to its ability to phosphorylate the monoamine transporters being similar in potency relative to MDMA.

Pharmacokinetics 

The two major metabolic pathways in mammals for methylone are N-demethylation to methylenedioxycathinone (MDC), and demethylation followed by O-methylation of the 3- or 4-hydroxy group to 4-hydroxy-3-methoxymethcathinone (HMMC) or 3-hydroxy-4-methoxymethcathinone (3-OH-4-MeO-MC). When 5 mg/kg of methylone was administered to rats, it was found that around 26% was excreted as HMMC within the first 48 hours (less than 3% excreted unchanged).

Commercial distribution 

Analysis of "Explosion" has confirmed that the active ingredient is methylone. Many other formulations marketed as household chemicals, as well as the pure powder, have been sold.

Legal status

Netherlands

In the Netherlands, methylone is not yet listed under the Opium Law, but is covered under the medicine act. Because methylone is not registered officially, it is forbidden to trade in methylone. The Minister of Health has asked the Coordination point Assessment and Monitoring new drugs group (CAM) to gather information about this substance, resulting possibly in an official risk assessment. Until now, no research has been conducted on the toxicity of methylone, so nothing is known about the harmfulness of this new drug.

New Zealand

In New Zealand, although methylone is not explicitly scheduled and falls outside the strict definitions of an "amphetamine analogue" in the Misuse of Drugs Act, it is considered to be "substantially similar" to methcathinone and is thus considered by law enforcement authorities to be a Class C illegal drug. Methylone was sold in New Zealand for around 6 months from November 2005 to April 2006 as an MDMA substitute, under the name "Ease". The product was withdrawn after legal disputes with the government.

UK

In the UK, methylone is illegal since the 16/04/2010 revision of the misuse of drugs act. Before this it was not specifically mentioned in United Kingdom (U.K.) law as the β-ketone was not covered under the Misuse of Drugs Act. In March 2010, plans were announced to make methylone and other cathinones, Class B drugs, "within weeks". While delayed by dissatisfaction in the Advisory Council on the Misuse of Drugs, the revision was rushed through by the government with little regard for the views of the council. The importation of the compounds was banned immediately.

Sweden

Sveriges riksdag added methylone to schedule I ("substances, plant materials and fungi which normally do not have medical use") as narcotics in Sweden as of Oct 1, 2010,  published by Medical Products Agency in their regulation LVFS 2010:23 listed as Metylon, 2-metylamino-1-(3,4-metylendioxifenyl)propan-1-on. Methylone was first classified by Sveriges riksdags health ministry  as "health hazard" under the act  (translated Act on the Prohibition of Certain Goods Dangerous to Health) as of Nov 1, 2005,  in their regulation SFS 2005:733 listed as 3,4-metylendioximetkatinon (Metylon).

Canada
Although not listed as a Schedule 1 substance, Health Canada reports that methylone falls under the scheduling as an analogue of amphetamine. However, Methylone bears the exact chemical difference between amphetamine and cathinone – and cathinone is listed as not being an analogue of amphetamine, possibly implying that methylone is unscheduled in Canada. The CDSA was updated as a result of the Safe Streets Act changing amphetamines from Schedule 3 to Schedule 1; however, methylone was not added.

United States

In October 2011, the DEA issued an emergency ban on methylone. It was made illegal to possess and distribute. On April 4, 2013, the DEA placed methylone as a Schedule 1 substance under the CSA.
 Arizona:
Effective February 16, 2012, methylenedioxymethcathinone (methylone) was classified as a dangerous drug, making it a felony to knowingly possess, use, possess for sale, manufacture, administer, transport for sale, import into the state, or offer to transport for sale or import into this state, sell, transfer or offer to sell or transfer. A.R.S. 13-3401(6)(c)(xliii), 2012 Ariz. Legis. Serv. Ch. 1 (H.B. 2356).
 Florida:
In January 2011, it was reported that Florida Attorney General Pam Bondi issued an emergency ban on MDPV, Methylone, Mephedrone, 3-methoxymethcathinon, 3-fluoromethcathinone, and 4-fluoromethcathinone as media attention on products labeled as "bath salts" grew. These chemicals are now Schedule I under Florida law.
 Louisiana:
In January 2011, Louisiana Governor Bobby Jindal emergency scheduled 3,4-methylenedioxymethcathinone (methylone), 3,4-methyenedioxypyrovalerone (MDPV), 4-methylmethcathinone (mephedrone), 4-methoxymethcathinone (methedrone), 4-fluoromethcathinone (flephedrone), and 3-fluoromethcathinone (3-FMC).
 Tennessee:
On May 5, 2011, Tennessee Governor Bill Haslam signed a law making it a crime to knowingly produce, manufacture, distribute, sell, offer for sale or possess with intent produce, manufacture, distribute, sell, or offer for sale any product containing 3,4-methylenedioxymethcathinone (methylone), 3,4-methyenedioxypyrovalerone (MDPV), 4-methylmethcathinone (mephedrone), 4-methoxymethcathinone (methedrone), 4-fluoromethcathinone (flephedrone), and 3-fluoromethcathinone (3-FMC).
 Texas:
In September 2011, Texas added 3,4-methylenedioxy-N-methylcathinone to the Penalty Group 2 listing of the Health and Safety Code.  Possession of a substance in penalty group 2 is a minimum of a state jail felony.
 Michigan:
Schedule 1 controlled substance in 2012.

Etymology 

"Methylone" is also a trademarked brand name for an injectable form of methylprednisolone, a corticosteroid hormone used to treat arthritis and severe allergic reactions; hence, methylone may be confused with it. Aside from context, they can be distinguished by the fact that the name will usually be capitalized when referring to the prescription drug.

A proposed alternate name is βk-MDMA, or beta-keto-MDMA. While this nomenclature has not caught on because the name "methylone" became widely used before the conflicting Methylone trademark was noticed, the analogous names for related chemicals βk-MDEA and βk-MBDB have become the established names for those substances.

See also 
Metylan

References 

Benzodioxoles
Cathinones
Designer drugs
Entactogens and empathogens
Euphoriants
Serotonin-norepinephrine-dopamine releasing agents